The Royal Sovereign class was a group of eight pre-dreadnought battleships built for the Royal Navy in the 1890s. The ships spent their careers in the Mediterranean, Home and Channel Fleets, sometimes as flagships, although several were mobilised for service with the Flying Squadron in 1896 when tensions with the German Empire were high following the Jameson Raid in South Africa. Three ships were assigned to the International Squadron formed when Greek Christians rebelled against the Ottoman Empire's rule in Crete in 1897–1898.

By about 1905–1907, they were considered obsolete and were reduced to reserve. The ships began to be sold off for scrap beginning in 1911, although  was sunk as a target ship during gunnery trials in 1913.  was fitted with the first anti-torpedo bulges to evaluate underwater protection schemes in 1911 before being scuttled as a blockship a few months after the start of the First World War in August 1914. Only  survived to see active service in the war, during which she bombarded the Belgian coastline. Renamed Redoubtable in 1915, she was hulked later that year as an accommodation ship until she was sold for scrap after the war.

Background

By the late 1880s pressure on the government to modernise and expand the Royal Navy was building. A war scare with Russia in 1885 during the Panjdeh Incident, the failure of the blockading fleet to contain the raiding ships in port during the 1888 fleet manoeuvres and more realistic evaluations of the numbers of ships required to perform the tasks required in a war against France, coupled with exposés by influential journalists like W. T. Stead, revealed serious weaknesses in the Navy. The Government responded with the Naval Defence Act 1889, which provided £21.5 million for a vast expansion programme of which the eight ships of the Royal Sovereign class were the centrepiece. The Act also formalised the two-power standard, whereby the Royal Navy sought to be as large as the next two major naval powers combined.

These ships were equipped with gun turrets, the weight of which dictated that they be low-freeboard ships to reduce their topweight. White, however, argued strenuously for a high-freeboard design to improve the new ships' ability to fight and steam in heavy weather. This meant that the armament could only be mounted in lighter, less-heavily armoured barbettes. After much discussion, the board came around to White's view and the design resembled an enlarged version of the earlier , although one of the eight ships, was built as a low-freeboard turret ship in deference to the First Sea Lord, Admiral Sir Arthur Hood, who had strongly argued for the type. The Royal Sovereigns are often considered the first of the type of battleship which would become known after the commissioning of the revolutionary  in 1906 as pre-dreadnoughts.

Design and description

Originally, the class was intended to be equipped with a new wire wound, 40 caliber long 12 inch gun. However the ship was instead fitted with 13.5 inch guns, similar to the ones found on the "Admirals" series of ships, as the board required 4 of the heaviest guns available, on the ship.

To reduce their topweight, White gave them a significant amount of tumblehome. Hoods freeboard, however, was only , which meant that she was very wet and lost speed rapidly as wave height increased. She was the last British battleship with the heavy, old-style, turrets and all future British battleships were of a high-freeboard design and had their main armament in barbettes, although the adoption of armoured, rotating gunhouses over the barbettes gradually led to them being called "turrets" as well.

This had the effect of making her roll period shorter by around 7% compared to her sister ship, which in turn made her gunnery less accurate. White had purposely selected a high metacentric height to minimise rolling and he did not think that bilge keels were needed. When  experienced heavy rolling during a heavy storm in December 1893, which earned the class the nickname Rolling Ressies, her sister, was fitted with bilge keels while still fitting out and conclusively demonstrated their effectiveness during comparative trials.

As a result, the Navy decided not to push the boilers of the Royal Sovereign class past 11,000 ihp to prevent similar damage.

Armament and armour

A new and more powerful  gun was preferred by the Board, but it was still under development, so the 32-calibre BL   gun used in the preceding classes was chosen. The four guns were mounted in two twin-gun, pear-shaped barbettes or circular turrets, one forward and one aft of the superstructure. The barbettes were open, without hoods or gun shields, and the guns were fully exposed. The ammunition hoists were in the apex of the barbette and the guns had to return to the fore-and-aft position to be reloaded. The ships carried 80 rounds for each gun.

The secondary armament of ten quick-firing (QF)  guns was a significant upgrade over the six QF  guns of the Trafalgar class. These guns were intended to destroy the unarmoured structure of their opponents and they were widely spaced on two decks so that a single hit would not disable more than one. Four of the guns were situated on the main deck and were only usable in calm weather because they were so close to the ships' waterline, while the remaining guns were above them on the upper deck. Sixteen QF 6-pounder  guns of an unknown type and a dozen QF 3-pounder  Hotchkiss guns were fitted for defence against torpedo boats (Hood only had eight 6-pounders). The Royal Sovereign-class ships also mounted seven 14-inch (356 mm) torpedo tubes, two submerged and four above water on the broadside, plus one above water in the stern.

The Royal Sovereigns' armour scheme was similar to that of the Trafalgars, as the waterline belt of compound armour only protected the area between the barbettes. Transverse bulkheads  (forward) and 14 inches (aft) thick formed the central armoured citadel. Above the belt was a strake of  armour, backed by deep coal bunkers, that was terminated by  oblique bulkheads that connected the upper side armour to the barbettes.

The submerged armour deck was 3 inches thick amidships and reduced to  towards the ends of the ship; the forward end curved downwards to reinforce the plough-shaped ram. The aft conning tower was protected by 3-inch plates, as was its communication tube. Between 1902 and 1904, the thin gun shields protecting the upper deck 6-inch guns were replaced by armoured casemates in all the ships except Hood, whose lack of stability prevented the addition of such weights high in the ship.

Modifications
Bilge keels were fitted in 1894–1895 to all ships that lacked them. The three-pounder guns in the upper fighting tops were removed from all ships in 1899–1902 as were the gun shields of the guns in the lower fighting tops, except in Empress of India which retained hers until 1903–1904. The above-water torpedo tubes were removed from all ships in 1902–1905 and armoured casemates were fitted to the 6-inch guns on the upper deck between 1902 and 1904. Fire-control equipment and rangefinders were installed in every ship in 1905–1908 and all light guns had been removed from the main deck and the fighting tops by 1909. The after bridge was removed from all but Revenge in 1910. Two years later that ship had her guns relined down to 10 inches (254 mm) for testing; the liners were removed in October 1912.

After the start of the First World War, Revenge was modified for coast bombardment duties. To extend the range of her guns, they were relined down to 12 inches (305 mm). The following year, she had anti-torpedo bulges fitted.

Ships

Operational history
Royal Sovereign, Repulse, Resolution and Empress of India were initially assigned to the Channel Fleet, with Royal Sovereign serving as the fleet flagship and the latter ship as the flagship of the second-in-command. Revenge and Royal Oak were commissioned into the Flying Squadron in 1896 when tensions with the German Empire were high following the Jameson Raid in South Africa, with the former as the flagship. Ramillies became flagship of the Mediterranean Fleet and was joined by Hood. All of the Channel Fleet ships participated in Queen Victoria's Diamond Jubilee fleet review in 1897. Empress of India and Royal Sovereign were transferred to the Mediterranean shortly after the review although only the former ship joined Ramillies and Hood as part of the International Squadron, a multinational force that intervened in the 1897–1898 Greek Christian uprising against the Ottoman Empire's rule in Crete.

Beginning in 1900 those ships deployed in the Mediterranean, except for Hood, began returning home and often served as a coastguard or guard ship before beginning a long refit in 1902–1903. Empress of India was the first of the sisters to be refitted and was the only ship of the class present at King Edward VII's Coronation Fleet Review in August 1902. The ship served as the flagship of the Home Fleet's second-in-command after her refit until she was relieved by Royal Oak in 1904. Revenge was the second ship to complete her refit and was the flagship of the Home Fleet until 1905. Most of the sisters were placed in reserve after the completion of their refit, although they usually participated in the annual fleet manoeuvres.

Resolution was the first ship of the class to be placed in reserve in June 1904. Royal Sovereign, Ramillies, Repulse, Revenge, Royal Oak and Empress of India followed in 1905. The latter ship accidentally collided with the submarine  the following year. With the exception of Revenge, they all were taken out of service in 1909–1912 and Empress of India was sunk as a target ship in 1913. Royal Sovereign and Ramillies were sold for scrap in October 1913, having been preceded by Repulse in July 1911 and followed by Royal Oak in January 1914 and Resolution in April.

Hood served most of her active career with the Mediterranean Fleet, where her low freeboard was less of a disadvantage. The ship was briefly placed in reserve in 1900 and became a guard ship the following year. She returned to the Mediterranean at the end of 1901, but only remained there for a year before returning to Chatham Dockyard for a refit. Hood was assigned to the Home Fleet upon its completion in mid-1903 and was reduced to reserve in early 1905. Four years later she became the receiving ship at Queenstown, Ireland. Hood was used in the development of anti-torpedo bulges in 1911–1913 and was scuttled in late 1914 to act as a blockship across the southern entrance of Portland Harbour.

Revenge was recommissioned in 1906 as a gunnery training ship until she was paid off in 1913. She was recommissioned the following year, after the start of the First World War, to bombard the coast of Flanders as part of the Dover Patrol, during which she was hit four times, but was not seriously damaged. She had anti-torpedo bulges fitted in early 1915, the first ship to be fitted with them operationally. Later that year the ship was renamed Redoubtable to release her name for use by the new battleship  and was refitted as an accommodation ship by the end of the year. The last surviving member of her class, the ship was sold for scrap in November 1919.

Notes

References
 
 
 
 
 
 Clowes, Sir William Laird. The Royal Navy: A History From the Earliest Times to the Death of Queen Victoria, Volume Seven. London: Chatham Publishing, 1997. .

External links

 World War 1 Naval Combat
 The Dreadnought Project

Battleship classes
 
Victorian-era battleships of the United Kingdom
World War I battleships of the United Kingdom
Ship classes of the Royal Navy